WQSC (1340 kHz) is an AM radio station licensed to Charleston, South Carolina.  It is owned by Kirkman Broadcasting and airs a classic country format. Studios and offices are on Marksfield Drive.  The transmitter is located off Braswell Street.

WQSC and former simulcaster WJKB previously aired a local morning news and interview show called The Morning Report with Jay Harper and John Dixon.  The rest of the weekday schedule is made up of nationally syndicated talk shows, including Laura Ingraham, Dennis Prager, Todd Schnitt, Jerry Doyle, Jim Bohannon, Overnight America with Jon Grayson, America in The Morning and This Morning, America's First News with Gordon Deal.  National news is supplied at the beginning of each hour by CBS Radio News.

History
WQSC first signed on in 1946 as WHAN.  Harry C. Weaver (June 12, 1916 – May 30, 2001), who had worked for the Knoxville Journal in Knoxville, Tennessee, and was part-owner of WOKE in Oak Ridge, Tennessee and WGAP in Maryville, Tennessee, bought WHAN in 1955, changing the call letters to WOKE in 1958.

WOKE was a unique station in Charleston. Its format included "good music", local and regional sports, religious programming, and news and weather forecasts. According to local radio buff J. Douglas Donehue, three of the station's announcers—Harry Weaver, Buck Clayton, and Tennessee Weaver—were all Harry C. Weaver himself.  Weaver's daily editorials began and ended in a style reminiscent of the fictional radio newsman Les Nessman from the TV show WKRP In Cincinnati. Saturdays were for sports or The Metropolitan Opera. Sunday airtime was filled with local and national religious programs.  Each night, the station would sign off the air following Mr. Weaver's poetry readings.

Fifteen-year-old John "Cousin Johnny" Busbee co-hosted the station's morning show "Carolina in the Morning" with Weaver's "Buck Clayton" for two years beginning in 1979.  When Busbee left for college in 1981, former evening host "Uncle" Dave Bannon took over hosting duties alongside Weaver.

The late morning program, "Talk of the Town" was directed toward housewives/homemakers and was originally hosted by Weaver's wife Ruth, and later by his daughter Kathy.  For over twenty years beginning in the 1970s operations manager Wally Momeier did the afternoon drive program "Hits and Gold Records of Yesterday and Today".

Gil Kirkman, who had worked for WOKE, bought the station in 1994, and changed the callsign to the current WQSC and a sports radio format in 1994.  The station moved to new facilities and the old WOKE studios were occupied by an insurance agency in 1999.

Don Imus was on WQSC prior to April 2007.

As of March 2009, the station dropped News/Talk format in favor of beach music.

The mission of WQSC 1340 "The Boardwalk" was to promote, preserve, and perpetuate South Carolina's popular music known as "beach music" and the South Carolina state dance "the Carolina shag".  On July 31, 2012, WQSC changed its format back to news/talk with Dave Solomon as the main station imaging voice.

Charleston Veteran Rocky D was chosen for afternoons at its launch.  Bryan Crabtree, a veteran real estate agent and news/talk broadcaster formerly with WTMA joined on June 24, 2013, to host mornings.

On December 6, 2016, WQSC changed their format from news/talk to sports, branded as "98.5 The Sports Zone" (simulcasting FM translator W243CO 98.5 FM Charleston, now W253BW).

On August 17, 2020, WQSC changed their format from sports ("The Zone", which moved to WTMZ 910 AM Charleston) to classic country, branded as "98.5 WQSC".

References

External links

Tribute site to WOKE

Classic country radio stations in the United States
QSC
Radio stations established in 1946
1946 establishments in South Carolina